Chaypareh may refer to:
 Chaypareh County, in West Azerbaijan Province
 Chaypareh-ye Bala Rural District, in Zanjan Province
 Chaypareh-ye Pain Rural District, in Zanjan Province